The Pirates! in an Adventure with the Romantics is the fifth novel in Gideon Defoe's The Pirates! series. It was released on 30 August 2012.

Plot
The Pirates encounter Romantic poets on the shore of Lake Geneva: Lord Byron, Percy Bysshe Shelley and Mary Shelley.

References

2012 British novels
British comedy novels
Novels set in Switzerland
Lake Geneva
The Pirates!
Orion Books books